Phassus eldorado is a moth of the family Hepialidae. It is known from Venezuela.

References

Moths described in 1906
Hepialidae